Wahoo Fitness is a fitness technology company based in Atlanta, Georgia. Its CEO is Mike Saturnia. Founded in 2009 by Chip Hawkins, Wahoo Fitness has offices in London, Berlin, Tokyo, Boulder and Brisbane.

Wahoo's portfolio of cycling industry products includes the KICKR family of Indoor Cycling Trainers and Accessories, the ELEMNT family of GPS Cycling Computers and sport watches, the TICKR family of Heart Rate Monitors, SPEEDPLAY Advanced Road Pedal systems and the Wahoo SYSTM Training App.

Main Products

Indoor Trainers & Smart Bikes
 KICKR Direct Drive Smart Trainer
 KICKR CORE Direct Drive Smart Trainer
 KICKR SNAP Wheel-On Smart Trainer
 KICKR BIKE Indoor Smart Bike
 KICKR ROLLR Smart Trainer

GPS Cycling Computers & Smart Watches
 ELEMNT ROAM GPS Bike Computer
 ELEMNT BOLT GPS Bike Computer
 ELEMNT RIVAL GPS Multisport Watch

Heart Rate Monitors
 TICKR Heart Rate Monitor
 TICKR FIT Heart Rate Armband
 TICKR X Heart Rate Monitor

Cycling Sensors
 RPM Cadence Sensor
 RPM Speed Sensor
 RPM Sensor Bundle
 BLUE SC Speed and Cadence Sensor

Indoor Training Accessories
 KICKR HEADWIND Smart Fan
 KICKR CLIMB Indoor Grade Simulator
 KICKR AXIS Action Feet
 KICKR Indoor Training Desk
 KICKR Floormat

Pedals
 POWRLINK ZERO Power Pedal System
 SPEEDPLAY AERO Stainless Steel Aerodynamic Road Pedals
 SPEEDPLAY NANO Titanium Road Pedals
 SPEEDPLAY ZERO Stainless Steel Road Pedals
 SPEEDPLAY COMP Chromoly Road Pedals
 Standard Tension Cleat
 Easy Tension Cleat

Training
 Wahoo SYSTM Training App

Acquisitions
 September 2019 - Pedal manufacturer, Speedplay
 July 2019 - Indoor training platform, The Sufferfest, later rebranded to Wahoo SYSTM
 April 2022 - Indoor training platform, RGT (Road Grand Tour) later rebranded to Wahoo RGT

Funding and investment
 2010 - Private Investment 
 July 2018 - Norwest Equity Partners
Q3 2021 - Rhône Group

Team sponsorship
Wahoo is an official sponsor for:

Women's Cycling Teams
 EF Education-Tibco-SVB
 Le Col-Wahoo
 Team DSM
 Trek-Segafredo
 Ceratizit-WNT
 Arkéa
 Bingoal Casino-Chevalmeire
 Rally Cycling
 Twenty24

Men's Cycling Teams
 EF Education-EasyPost
 Bora-Hansgrohe 
 Alpecin-Fenix
 Hagens Berman Axeon
 Deceuninck–Quick-Step
 AG2R Citroën
 Team DSM
 Trek-Segafredo
 Cofidis
 Arkéa-Samsic
 Novo Nordisk
 Rally Cycling
 WiV SunGod
 Maloja Pushbikers
 Ribble Weldtite
 P&S Metalltechnik
 Trinity Racing
 Tirol KTM

References

External links
 

Companies based in Atlanta
Electronics companies of the United States
Embedded systems